BellSouth Open may refer to:

 Heineken Open (tennis), a men's tennis tournament sponsored by BellSouth in 1996 and 1997
 Chile Open (tennis), a men's tennis tournament sponsored by BellSouth from 2002 to 2005